The 2015 FIFA U-17 World Cup was the sixteenth tournament of the FIFA U-17 World Cup, held in Chile from 17 October to 8 November 2015.

Host selection
The following four countries bid to host the tournament:

Venues
Along with proposing ten venues for Chile's hosting of the 2015 Copa América, the Chilean Football Federation also announced its plans for hosting of the U17 World Cup in the same year. On 8 April 2014, 8 cities were confirmed as host of the competition, with Copiapó and Quillota being dropped.

The Local organising committee have also said that the capital City (Santiago) would not host the final.

Qualified teams
In addition to host nation Chile, 23 nations qualified from 6 separate continental competitions.

1.Teams that made their debut.

Schedule and draw
The schedule of the tournament was unveiled on 5 May 2015.

The final draw was held on 6 August 2015, 20:00 local time, at the Centro de las Artes 660 art gallery in Santiago. For the draw, the 24 teams were divided into four seeding pots:
Pot 1: Hosts and continental champions of five confederations (except UEFA)
Pot 2: Remaining teams from CONCACAF and AFC
Pot 3: Remaining teams from CAF and CONMEBOL
Pot 4: Teams from UEFA

As a basic principle, teams from the same confederation could not be drawn against each other at the group stage.

Match officials
A total of 21 referees, 6 support referees, and 42 assistant referees were selected for the tournament.

Emblem and slogan
The emblem and slogan ("Una fiesta en nuestra cancha", a party on our pitch) of the tournament was unveiled on 7 October 2014.

Squads

Each team named a squad of 21 players (three of whom must be goalkeepers) by the FIFA deadline. The squads were announced on 8 October 2015.

All players of its representative team must have been born on or after 1 January 1998.

Group stage
The winners and runners-up of each group and the best four third-placed teams advance to the round of 16. The rankings of teams in each group are determined as follows:

If two or more teams are equal on the basis of the above three criteria, their rankings are determined as follows:

All times are local, Chile Standard Time (UTC−3).

Group A

Group B

Group C

Group D

Group E

Group F

Ranking of third-placed teams
The four best ranked third-placed teams also advance to the round of 16. They are paired with the winners of groups A, B, C and D, according to a table published in Section 18 of the tournament regulations.

Knockout stage
In the knockout stages, if a match is level at the end of normal playing time, the match is determined by a penalty shoot-out (no extra time is played).

Bracket

Combinations of matches in the Round of 16
The third-placed teams advanced to the round of 16 were placed with the winners of groups A, B, C and D according to a table published in Section 18 of the tournament regulations.

Round of 16

Quarter-finals

Semi-finals

Third place match

Final

Awards
The following awards were given at the conclusion of the tournament. They were all sponsored by adidas.

In December 2015, Nigerian Samuel Chukwueze was retroactively awarded the Bronze boot award. Kelechi Nwakali had erroneously been awarded the award immediately following the tournament but as he had played more minutes (630) than Chukwueze (535) in the tournament the award was re-allocated.

Final ranking
As per statistical convention in football, matches decided in extra time are counted as wins and losses, while matches decided by penalty shoot-outs are counted as draws.

Goalscorers
10 goals

 Victor Osimhen

4 goals

 Johannes Eggestein

3 goals

 Dante Rigo
 Sidiki Maïga
 Francisco Venegas
 Kelechi Nwakali
 Samuel Chukwueze
 Fyodor Chalov

2 goals

 Nicholas Panetta
 Jorn Vancamp
 Dante Vanzeir
 Leandro
 Marcelo Allende
 Karlo Majić
 Nikola Moro
 Washington Corozo
 Pervis Estupiñán
 Yeison Guerrero
 Jhon Pereira
 Bilal Boutobba
 Odsonne Edouard
 Jonathan Ikoné
 Nicolas Janvier
 Vitaly Janelt
 Felix Passlack
 Amadou Haidara
 Sekou Koita
 Aly Malle
 Boubacar Traoré
 Pablo López
 Claudio Zamudio
 Diego Cortés
 Kevin Magaña
 Julio Villalba
 Georgi Makhatadze
 Brandon Vazquez

1 goal

 Tomás Conechny
 Pierce Waring
 Dennis Van Vaerenbergh
 Matthias Verreth
 Arthur
 Lincoln
 Luís Henrique
 Gonzalo Jara
 Brian Leiva
 Yerko Leiva
 Gabriel Mazuela
 Camilo Moya
 Kevin Masis
 Diego Mesén
 Sergio Ramírez
 Andy Reyes
 Josip Brekalo
 Luka Ivanušec
 Davor Lovren
 Joan Cortez
 Juan Nazareno
 Kaylen Hinds
 Alexis Claude-Maurice
 Mamadou Doucoure
 Alec Georgen
 Faitout Maouassa
 Dayot Upamecano
 Niklas Schmidt
 Naby Bangoura
 Morlaye Sylla
 Foslyn Grant
 Jafeth Leiva
 Abdoul Karim Danté
 Eduardo Aguirre
 Ricardo Marín
 Bryan Salazar
 Hunter Ashworth
 Lucas Imrie
 James McGarry
 Udochukwu Anumudu
 Chukwudi Agor
 Funsho Bamgboye
 Christian Ebere
 Edidiong Essien
 Kingsley Michael
 Orji Okwonkwo
 Jong Chang-bom
 Kim Wi-song
 Pak Yong-gwan
 Arturo Aranda
 David Colmán
 Sebastián Ferreira
 Jorge Morel
 Marcelino Ñamandú
 Cristian Paredes
 Ivan Galanin
 Jang Jae-won
 Oh Se-hun
 Khanyisa Mayo
 Thendo Mukumela
 Anas Al-Aji
 Christian Pulisic

1 own goal
 James McGarry (playing against France)

Marketing

Sponsorship
FIFA partners
Adidas
Coca-Cola
Gazprom
Visa
Hyundai

National suppliers
Clinica MEDS
Movistar Chile
Pullman Bus
Universidad Santo Tomás
VTR

Mascot and anthem
The official mascot, a young boy named Brochico, and anthem, composed by DJ Méndez, were unveiled on 9 July 2015.

Broadcasting

United States
Fox Sports: English language, Telemundo: Spanish language

Bulgaria
BNT

Canada
TSN.

Germany
ARD and ZDF.

Indonesia
Rajawali Televisi

Laos
TVLAO

United Kingdom
BBC, ITV, Eurosport.

New Zealand
Sky Sport

South Africa, Sub Sahara Africa and Nigeria
Startimes Sports

South Korea
SBS, KBS, and MBC

References

External links
FIFA U-17 World Cup Chile 2015, FIFA.com
FIFA Technical Report

2015
2015 in youth association football
2015
2015–16 in Chilean football
October 2015 sports events in South America
November 2015 sports events in South America